The Untied States of Elephant Micah is the second album by Indiana lo-fi/indie musician Joe O'Connell, a.k.a. Elephant Micah. Originally released on CD-R by Orphanology in September 2002, it was officially released on BlueSanct Records in February, 2004. Only 52 copies of the original CD-R were made, and it included 3 live recordings which are not on the reissue.

Track listing
"Vet Sounds"
"Grace of St. Christopher"
"Rides Away Again"
"Ohio Arch"
"%%%%%%%%%%%%"
"April 32nd"
"Unairconditioned Instrumental"
"Two TV Sets"
"Everything Is Good"
"###########"
"Ohio Arch Reprise"
"Old Song On New Love"

Elephant Micah albums
2002 albums